Maged N. Kamel Boulos is a British health informatician, scientist and Full Professor of Digital Health with Sun Yat-sen University (China), having worked before that at the Alexander Graham Bell Centre of Digital Health, University of the Highlands and Islands, at the University of Plymouth, at the University of Bath and at City University London. Other held affiliations include Universidade de Lisboa (Visiting Professor in 2022). He is particularly known for his research into Geographic Information Systems (GIS) applications in health and healthcare, which received wide news media coverage. He is credited with coining the phrases 'online consumer geoinformatics services' and 'wikification of GIS by the masses'   in 2005, when neogeography and virtual globes were still very new.

Kamel Boulos is Founder and Editor-in-Chief of the Open Access, MEDLINE-indexed International Journal of Health Geographics, published by BioMed Central since 2002. He is Co-Chair of WG IV/4: Virtual Globes and Context-Aware Visualisation/Analysis within the International Society for Photogrammetry and Remote Sensing (ISPR) Commission IV Geodatabases and Digital Mapping, 2008-2012.

See also 
 GIS and Public Health

References

External links
 Publications (partial list) in PubMed

Health informaticians
British medical researchers
British scientists
Academics of the University of the Highlands and Islands
Academics of the University of Plymouth
Living people
Academics of the University of Bath
Academics of City, University of London
Year of birth missing (living people)
Geographic information scientists